Drawing the Line may refer to:

 Drawing the Line (book), a 1962 book republication of Paul Goodman's "The May Pamphlet"
 Drawing the Line (film), a 1915 short film by B. Reeves Eason
 Drawing the Line (play), a 2013 play by Howard Brenton
 "Drawing the Line", a track from the 2009 album The Incident by British progressive rock band Porcupine Tree

See also
 Draw the Line (disambiguation)